Galador may refer to:
Galador, the first prince of Dol Amroth, a city in Gondor in Tolkien's Middle-earth
the homeworld of the Galadorians, an alien race in the DC Comics universe
the homeworld of the Galadorians, a humanoid race in the Marvel Comics universe
Rom the Space Knight'''s homeworld

See alsoGalidor: Defenders of the Outer Dimension''